This is a list of cast members and guest stars on Ugly Betty.

Core regulars

The season(s) during which each actor has been included in the main cast are marked in black. Note that the actors  don't necessarily appear in every episode during their time as a main star.

When a starring actor also has appeared as a guest star during other seasons, this is marked in gray.

1 Promoted from guest star to main cast in season 1, episode 14, "I'm Coming Out"
2 Became main cast in season 1, episode 13, "In or Out"
3 Left the main cast in season 2, episode 10, "Bananas for Betty" 
4 Left the main cast in season 4, episode 11 "Back In Her Place"
5 Left the main cast in season 3, episode 4 "Betty Suarez Land"
6 Left the main cast in season 3, episode 21 "The Born Identity"

Recurring

Other/minor roles

Notes
 - Listed as "Guest Starring" in opening credits, but became full-time regular after episode "Sofia's Choice".
 - Became recurring regulars after their second appearance.
 - Gorham and Light became recurring regulars in the first season; Both became full-time regulars in the second season.
 - Alexis Meade was initially played by Elizabeth Penn Payne (when she was listed in the credits as "Masked Lady"). Rebecca Romijn took over the role in In or Out.
 - Newton plays the most characters on the show. In one episode, she played Ruthie, the equivalent of Betty who works at MYW, and she took over the role of Fey Sommers to better resemble Amanda.
 - Listed as "Guest Starring" in opening credits, but became a full-time regular after episode "Sofia's Choice"; Still listed in credits as a regular but has not been seen since "Brothers".
 - Romijn will be demoted to recurring during Season 3.

Season One guest stars

Notes
¹—To be recurring regulars in Second Season.

Season Two guest stars

Season Three guest stars

References

See also
List of Ugly Betty episodes
List of characters in Ugly Betty

Ugly Betty